Vlača is a village and municipality in Vranov nad Topľou District in the Prešov Region of eastern Slovakia.

History
In historical records the village was first mentioned in 1349.

Geography
The municipality lies at an altitude of 200 metres and covers an area of 4.254 km². It has a population of about 230 people.

External links
 
https://web.archive.org/web/20070513023228/http://www.statistics.sk/mosmis/eng/run.html

Villages and municipalities in Vranov nad Topľou District
Šariš